

Group A

Head coach:  Brent Sutter

Head coach:  Miroslav Přerost

Head coach:  Ernst Höfner

Head coach:  Ernest Bokroš

Head coach:  Don Lucia

Group B

Head coach:  Karri Kivi

Head coach:  Ørjan Løvdal

Head coach:  Mikhail Varnakov

Head coach:  Rikard Grönborg

Head coach:  Colin Muller

External links
worldjunior2014.com

Rosters
World Junior Ice Hockey Championships rosters